Ischnoleomimus arriagadai is a species of beetle in the family Cerambycidae. It was described by Galileo and Martins in 2004. It is known from Paraguay.

References

Desmiphorini
Beetles described in 2004